Marthe Scharning Lund (born 5 July 1976) is a Norwegian politician for the Labour Party.

She hails from Skien. She served as a deputy representative to the Parliament of Norway from Telemark during the terms 1997–2001 and 2001–2005. Following the 2005 election, she was appointed as a political adviser in the Ministry of Children and Families, serving in Stoltenberg's Second Cabinet. She later served as a deputy representative to Pariament from Oslo during the terms 2017–2021. In total she met during 256 days of parliamentary session.

She was also a political adviser in the Labour Party parliamentary group. In the city government of Oslo, Lund became chief of staff for Raymond Johansen, later to serve briefly as City Commissioner of Business and Ownership. In 2021, her successor Victoria Marie Evensen named Lund to chair the board of Oslo Port Authority.

References

1976 births
Living people
People from Skien
Deputy members of the Storting
Labour Party (Norway) politicians
Politicians from Telemark
Politicians from Oslo